Illia Pavlovich Briukhov (Russian: Илья Брюхов; born 8 August 1998 in Ukraine) is a Ukrainian footballer.

Career

In 2016, Briukhov signed for Italian Serie A side Cagliari Calcio.

In 2019, he returned to Ukraine with Avanhard Kramatorsk after playing for S.E.F. Torres 1903 in the Italian fourth division.

In 2020, he signed for Ukrainian second division club Kremin Kremenchuk.

References

External links
 Illia Briukhov at FootballFacts

Ukrainian footballers
Living people
1998 births
Association football defenders